Nothosauridae are an extinct family of carnivorous aquatic sauropterygian reptiles from the Triassic time period of China, France, Germany, Israel, Italy, Netherlands, Russia, Switzerland,  and northern Africa.

Phylogeny
The cladogram shown below follows Rieppel (1998)'s phylogenetic analysis of nothosaurids (bold terminal taxa contain living species). Most of these relations are still considered correct today, but despite Rieppel (1998)'s referral of Ceresiosaurus and Silvestrosaurus to Lariosaurus, some authors still consider them separate and many additional species have been named since this analysis.

A species level phylogenetic analysis of Nothosauridae was performed by Liu et al. (2014), and included all known valid species of the family apart from Lariosaurus stensioi (type of Micronothosaurus), Nothosaurus cymatosauroides, and Ceresiosaurus lanzi. The resultant topology is similar to the one obtained in Rieppel (1998) if the new additions are ignored, however this analysis found both Lariosaurus and Nothosaurus to be polyphyletic in regard to each-other and all other genera of the family, making a systematic revision of these two genera necessary. Below, their results are shown with type species of named nothosaurid genera noted.

See also

Nothosauria
Pachypleurosaur

References

Triassic reptiles
Triassic first appearances
Triassic extinctions
Prehistoric reptile families